Matías Ezequiel Suárez (born 9 May 1988) is an Argentine professional footballer who plays for River Plate as a forward.

Career

Club Atlético Belgrano
Suárez started his professional career at Club Atlético Belgrano in 2006. He was Club Atlético Belgrano's top scorer in the Primera B Nacional of Argentina in 2007–08. Due to his performances he attracted the attention of Arsenal.

Anderlecht
In 2008 Suárez moved from Belgrano and completed his transfer to Anderlecht. He went on to establish himself as a key member of the Anderlecht side contributing many goals and assists in the process, especially following the departure of the team's star player Romelu Lukaku to Chelsea in the summer of 2011.

The 2011–2012 season was his best so far, on a personal level and with the team. While Anderlecht were crowned Belgian champions, Suárez was crowned Player of the Year 2011 and elected Player of the Season 2011–2012 by his professional colleagues in Belgium. After a highly successful season, Matias Suarez was officially signed by CSKA Moscow. The fee was undisclosed and later cancelled as Suárez failed the medical tests and returned to Anderlecht afterwards.

Return to Belgrano
After the 2016 terrorist attacks on Brussels, Suárez announced his intention to leave Anderlecht at the end of the season, despite Anderlecht and Belgrano not agreeing on a transfer fee. As a consequence, he terminated his contract unilaterally, allegedly fearing for his family's safety. In December 2017, FIFA delivered a decision in favor of Anderlecht, ruling out any alleged threat on Suárez family and ordered Suárez and his club to pay Anderlecht compensation. The club filed a complaint to FIFA Dispute Resolution Chamber, which ordered the player to pay €540,350 to the club. Both the player and the club filed an appeal to the Court of Arbitration for Sport. The court ordered the player and Belgrano jointly liable to pay Anderlecht €1,212,225.23.

River Plate
On 26 January 2019, River Plate paid Belgrano 2.8 million dollars for the player's rights. Suárez signed a three-and-a-half-year contract with his new team.
He scored his first goal on his debut on 30 January 2019, against Godoy Cruz.

International
He made his debut for Argentina national football team on 22 March 2019 in a friendly against Venezuela, as a half-time substitute for Pity Martínez.

Honours
R.S.C. Anderlecht
 Belgian Pro League: 2009–10, 2011–12, 2012–13, 2013–14
 Belgian Super Cup: 2010, 2012, 2013, 2014

River Plate
 Recopa Sudamericana: 2019

Individual
 Footballer of the Year in Jupiler League: 2011–12
 Belgian Golden Shoe: 2011

Career statistics

Personal life
He is the uncle of fellow footballers Federico Álvarez and Gastón Álvarez Suárez. He is married to singer Magalí Olave and has two children.

References

External links
 BDFA profile

1988 births
Living people
Footballers from Córdoba, Argentina
Association football forwards
Argentine footballers
Argentine expatriate footballers
Argentina international footballers
Club Atlético Belgrano footballers
Club Atlético River Plate footballers
R.S.C. Anderlecht players
Argentine Primera División players
Primera Nacional players
Belgian Pro League players
Expatriate footballers in Belgium
Argentine expatriate sportspeople in Belgium
2019 Copa América players